The Presidency of the Socialist Federal Republic of Yugoslavia (Bosnian and ,) was the collective head of state of the Socialist Federal Republic of Yugoslavia. It was established in 1971 according to amendments to the 1963 Constitution and reorganized by the 1974 Constitution. Up to 1974, the Presidency had 23 members – three from each republic, two from each autonomous province and President Josip Broz Tito. In 1974 the Presidency was reduced to 9 members – one from each republic and autonomous province and, until 1988, President of the League of Communists of Yugoslavia ex officio.

Constitutional powers

According to the 1974 Constitution, the Presidency had following powers:
 representing the federation both inside and outside the country
 commanding the Yugoslav People's Army, deciding on using the army both in war and in peace
 protecting equality of Yugoslav nationalities
 protecting the constitutional order
 proposing a candidate for the federal prime minister
 proposing candidates for federal constitutional judges
 appointing the ambassadors and generals and admirals
 appointing the National Defense Council and, if needed, also other agencies (one of such was Federal Council for Protection of the Constitutional Order)
 giving quarters and awarding state decorations

The Presidency had eight members elected by parliaments of each republic and autonomous province and proclaimed by the Federal Assembly of the SFRY, the ninth member was president of the Presidency of the League of Communists of Yugoslavia. This ex officio membership of the LCY leader was abolished by the constitutional changes in autumn 1988. The mandate of the Presidency lasted five years so the nine-member Presidency was elected in total four times – in 1974, 1979, 1984 and 1989.

Until 1980 most of powers of the Presidency (and control over the country in general) were in fact exercised by Josip Broz Tito, who was president of the republic for life. After his death in May 1980, his office stayed vacant and the Presidency began to function according to the constitution.

Sometimes, the Presidency held its sessions in an extended composition. Besides the members of the actual Presidency, in such sessions took part following officials: chairman of the Federal Assembly, chairman and vice-chairman of the Federal Executive Council (the government), federal secretaries (ministers) of defense, interior and foreign affairs, chairman of the Federal Conference of the Socialist Alliance of Working People of Yugoslavia and chairmen of the Presidencies of the Yugoslav republics and autonomous provinces. The extended Presidency wasn't grounded in the Constitution and couldn't itself adopt any decisions.

Post-Tito period
Tito, as a president of the republic, was ex officio chairman of the Presidency. After his death a new chairman of the Presidency was elected every year. The order of rotating of the members on the leading position was agreed in advance, so this annual election was a pure formality. The rotating system jammed only in May 1991 –Stipe Mesić, representative of Franjo Tuđman's new Croatian government in the Presidency, was about to become the chairman but wasn't elected due to opposition of a half of the Presidency controlled by Serbian leader Slobodan Milošević. The top state office of the disintegrating federation remained vacant until 1 July when Mesić was finally elected.

Only one year after Tito's death, Yugoslav leaders had to face violent riots in Kosovo. On 2 April 1981 the Presidency under chairmanship of Cvijetin Mijatović declared a state of emergency in Priština and Kosovska Mitrovica, which lasted one week. The Presidency declared the state of emergency again, that time on the whole territory of Kosovo, on 27 February 1989 under chairmanship of Raif Dizdarević, when even more serious disorders in Kosovo broke out. For the third time in post-Tito Yugoslavia, the state of emergency in Kosovo was imposed by the Presidency in February 1990.

The composition of the last Presidency elected in May 1989 reflected both approach of political pluralism in some parts of the federation and the beginning of agony in Yugoslavia:
 Janez Drnovšek from Slovenia and Bogić Bogićević from Bosnia and Herzegovina were elected in direct elections held in their republics
 representatives of  Serbia, Montenegro, Kosovo and Vojvodina, i.e. half of the Presidency, were acting under de facto control of Slobodan Milošević
 Stipe Šuvar, Croat representative of strongly pro-Yugoslav opinions, was in October 1990 replaced by Stipe Mesić nominated by Croatian government.
In summer 1991 Mesić and Drnovšek, regarding their republics independent, ceased to attend sessions of the Presidency. They were followed by Bogićević and Vasil Tupurkovski from Macedonia, so that the Presidency de facto ceased to exist, although the members from Serbia, her provinces (Kosovo and Vojvodina) and Montenegro continued to hold sessions until 1992.

Composition (1971–1992)

Notes

 Died while holding the office
 Resigned when he became Chairman of the Federal Executive Council
 Resigned due to accusation of participation in the Agrokomerc scandal
 Recalled by the Croatian Parliament
 Recalled by the Serbian Parliament
 Recalled by the Serbian Parliament
 Recalled by the Montenegrin Parliament

Members
List of members of the Presidency of Yugoslavia

See also
List of heads of state of Yugoslavia
President of the Presidency of Yugoslavia
Vice President of the Presidency of Yugoslavia
Prime Minister of Yugoslavia
Presidency of Bosnia and Herzegovina

References

Socialist Federal Republic of Yugoslavia
Yugoslavia
1971 establishments in Yugoslavia
1992 disestablishments in Yugoslavia